Rock Bones were an Argentine pop rock musical group from Buenos Aires. The band emerged in 2011 of the television series Peter Punk of Disney XD. The band is originally formed by lead singer and bassist Juan Ciancio, guitarist and backing vocalist Gastón Vietto and drummer Guido Pennelli.

Discography

Studio albums

Singles

Other appearances

References

External links 
 

Argentine pop music groups
Rock en Español music groups
Musical groups established in 2011
Musical groups disestablished in 2014
Argentine rock music groups
Pop rock groups
Musical groups from Buenos Aires
2011 establishments in Argentina